Josef Lanzendörfer (born 24 March 1907; date of death unknown) was a bobsledder who competed for Czechoslovakia in the mid-1930s. He won a silver medal in the two-man event at the 1935 FIBT World Championships in Igls.

Lanzendörfer also competed at the 1936 Winter Olympics in Garmisch-Partenkirchen, finishing 20th in the two-man event and did not finish the four-man event.

References
 1936 bobsleigh two-man results
 1936 bobsleigh four-man results
 Bobsleigh two-man world championship medalists since 1931
 Josef Lanzendörfer's profile at Sports Reference.com

1907 births
Year of death missing
Czechoslovak male bobsledders
Olympic bobsledders of Czechoslovakia
Bobsledders at the 1936 Winter Olympics
German Bohemian people